Rivas is a surname of Spanish origin, likely derived from riba, an archaic term for the shore of a river. Notable people with the surname include:

Government
Cándido Muatetema Rivas (1960–2014), Equatorial Guinea politician
Francisco Rivas Almada, Paraguayan Minister of Industry and Commerce
Juan José González Rivas (born 1951), Spanish jurist and magistrate
Luz Rivas (born 1974), American politician in California
Martín Rivas Texeira (born 1969), Peruvian politician and lawyer
Miguel Ángel Burelli Rivas (1922–2003), Venezuelan lawyer, diplomat and politician
Patricio Rivas, President of Nicaragua from 1855 to 1857 as a puppet of William Walker
Robert Rivas (politician) (born 1980), American politician in California

Sports

Boxing
Adonis Rivas (born 1972), Nicaraguan boxer and former WBO Super Flyweight and Flyweight world champion
Óscar Rivas (born 1987), Colombian boxer

Football (soccer)
Antonio Rivas (Spanish footballer) (born 1965), Spanish footballer and football manager
Avimiled Rivas (born 1984), Colombian footballer
David Rivas (born 1978), Spanish footballer
Diego Rivas (footballer, born 1980), Spanish footballer
Emanuel Rivas (born 1983), Argentine footballer
Gelmin Rivas (born 1989), Venezuelan footballer
Jesús Rivas (footballer) (born 2002), Mexican footballer
Joaquín Rivas (born 1992), Salvadoran footballer
José Alejandro Rivas (born 1998), Venezuelan footballer
José Arturo Rivas (born 1984), Mexican footballer
José María Rivas (1958–2016), Salvadorian footballer
Martín Rivas (footballer, born 1977), Uruguayan footballer
Nano Rivas (born 1980), Spanish footballer and football manager
Nelson Rivas (born 1983), Colombian footballer
Rigoberto Rivas (born 1998), Honduran footballer
Sergio Rivas (born 1997), Mexican footballer
Stalin Rivas (born 1971), Venezuelan footballer
Ulíses Rivas (born 1996), Mexican footballer
Willy Rivas (born 1985), Peruvian footballer

Other
Alfonso Rivas (born 1996), Mexican-American baseball player
Betsi Rivas (born 1986), Venezuelan weightlifter
Claudia Rivas (born 1989), Mexican triathlete
Diego Rivas (fighter) (born 1991), UFC Fighter
Garrett Rivas (born 1985), American gridiron football kicker
Lázaro Rivas (1975–2013), Cuban former Greco-Roman wrestler and 2000 Olympic silver medalist
Llimy Rivas (born 1968), Colombian retired hurdler
Ramón Rivas (born 1966), Puerto Rican former basketball player
Thaimara Rivas (born 1982), Venezuelan heptathlete
Webster Rivas (born 1990), Dominican baseball player
Vanessa Rivas (1984-1999).  4-time POGs championship winner.  Rivas was killed in a gang-related shooting in 1999.

Other
Antonieta Rivas Mercado (1900–1931), Mexican feminist and writer; daughter of Antonio
Antonio Rivas Mercado (1853–1927), Mexican architect; father of Antonieta
Carlos Rivas (disambiguation), multiple people
Diogenes Rivas (born 1942), Venezuelan composer
Érica Rivas (born 1974), Argentine actress
Eva Rivas, Russian-Armenian singer
Idubina Rivas (born 1994), Salvadorian beauty pageant winner
Manuel Rivas (born 1957), Galician writer, poet and journalist
María Rivas (actress) (1931–2013), Spanish actress

See also
 Riva (surname)

References

Surnames of Spanish origin